Simone Giannelli (born 9 August 1996) is an Italian volleyball player, a member of the Italy men's national volleyball team and Italian club Sir Safety Perugia, silver medalist of the 2015 World Cup, bronze medalist of the 2015 European Championship and gold medalist of the 2021 Men's European Volleyball Championship and the 2022 FIVB Volleyball Men's World Championship.

Career
He had proved himself an up-and-coming star within volleyball, by achieving the Finals MVP award at the 2014-2015 Italian Volleyball League won by his team against Modena Volley. He then followed the trend up by taking the starting 7 in the national team, despite competition by players like Dragan Travica, Michele Baranowicz and Marco Falaschi.

In his first year in the national team he won a silver medal at the 2015 FIVB Volleyball Men's World Cup and a bronze medal at the 2015 Men's European Volleyball Championship, where he was also awarded the prize for best setter, the youngest in the history of the tournament.

26-year-old Giannelli is the only player to have earned MVP awards at both FIVB World Championship and FIVB Club World Championship.

Sporting achievements

Clubs

CEV Champions League
  2015/2016 - with Trentino Diatec
  2020/2021 - with Itas Trentino

FIVB Club World Championship
  Poland 2018 – with Trentino Volley
  Brazil 2022 – with Sir Safety Susa Perugia

CEV Cup
  CEV Cup 2019 – with Trentino Diatec

National championships
 2012/2013  Italian Championship, with Trentino Volley
 2014/2015  Italian Championship, with Trentino Volley
 2016/2017  Italian Championship, with Diatec Trentino
 2021/2022  Italian Cup, with Sir Safety Perugia
 2022/2023  Italian Super Cup, with Sir Safety Susa Perugia

National team
 2015  CEV European Championship
 2015  FIVB World Cup
 2016  Olympic Games
 2021  CEV European Championship
 2022  FIVB World Championship

Individual
 2015 Best Player in Serie A1
 2015 CEV European Championship – Best Setter
 2016 CEV Champions League – Best Setter
 2016 FIVB World League – Best Setter
 2016 FIVB Club World Championship – Best Setter
 2017 FIVB World Grand Champions Cup – Best Setter
 2018 FIVB Club World Championship – Best Setter
 2021 European Championship – Most Valuable Player
 2022 FIVB World Championship – Most Valuable Player
 2022 FIVB World Championship – Best Setter
 2022 FIVB Club World Championship – Most Valuable Player
 2022 FIVB Club World Championship – Best Setter

References

External links
 
 FIVB profile
 Trentino Volley player profile
 

1996 births
Living people
Italian men's volleyball players
Olympic volleyball players of Italy
Olympic silver medalists for Italy
Olympic medalists in volleyball
Volleyball players at the 2016 Summer Olympics
Volleyball players at the 2020 Summer Olympics
Medalists at the 2016 Summer Olympics
Setters (volleyball)
Trentino Volley players
Sportspeople from Bolzano